During the 1988–89 English football season, Charlton Athletic F.C. competed in the Football League First Division.

Kit
Charlton's kit was manufactured by Admiral and sponsored by The Woolwich.

Squad

Left club during season

Standings

References

1988-89
Charlton Athletic